The largescale pupfish (Cyprinodon macrolepis) is a species of fish in the family Cyprinodontidae. This pupfish is endemic to Chihuahua in Mexico, where it is found only in a small spring known as El Ojo de Hacienda Delores and its outlet canal.

References

Cyprinodon
Endemic fish of Mexico
Pupfish, Largescale
Endangered fish
Endangered biota of Mexico
Taxa named by Robert Rush Miller
Fish described in 1976
Taxonomy articles created by Polbot